The Zouave is an 1856 stone statue by French artist Georges Diebolt, which has been sited on the Pont de l'Alma in Paris since the 1850s.  The statue is used as an informal flood marker for the level of the River Seine in Paris.

Background
An arch bridge over the Seine was first constructed at this location in Paris in the 1850s, connecting the Avenue George V (formerly the Avenue d'Alma) to the Quai d'Orsay and Quai Branly.  The new bridge was named after the 1854 Battle of Alma in the Crimean War.  The two supporting piers of the bridge in the river were decorated with military sculptures, one on each side of each pier.  Each of the four sculptures depicts a French soldier from the Crimean War: a Zouave and a grenadier by Georges Diebolt, and a chasseur and an artilleryman by Auguste Arnaud.  

Three of the four statues on the Pont de l'Alma were removed and relocated when the bridge was reconstructed as a wider girder bridge in the 1970s, but The Zouave was reinstalled on the new bridge, although in a somewhat lower position.

Description
The French Zouave wears the traditional uniform based on the styles of clothing worn in North Africa in the early 1800s, with a short open-fronted jacket, sashes, and baggy trousers (sirwal) gathered above the ankle. The figure has removed its fez, and is resting on a grounded rifle. It is said to have been modelled on André-Louis Gody.

The Zouave statue is used as an informal flood marker in Paris: the footpaths along the embankments beside the Seine were usually closed when the level of the river reached the feet of The Zouave, and the river was unnavigable by the time it reached his thighs.  At the time of the 1910 Great Flood of Paris, the floodwater reached his shoulders.  The official point for measuring the level of the river is now at the Pont d'Austerlitz: before 1876 it was at Pont de la Tournelle.

References
 Zouave statue on Pont de l'Alma in Paris, travelfranceonline.com, 5 February 2018
 The Zouave of the River Seine – Famous statue
 Zouave de Paris : qui est-il vraiment?, vivreparis.fr, 1 February 2018 (in French)
 Qui est ce Zouave, vigie des crues de Paris ?, franceculture.fr, 26 January 2018 (in French)
 Les histoires extraordinaires - Le Zouave du Pont de l'Alma, europe1.fr, 28 January 2018 (in French)

1856 sculptures
Monuments and memorials in Paris
Sculptures in Paris
Outdoor sculptures in France
Stone sculptures in France